Headache is a board game for in which the object is to land a playing piece (known as "cones" or "men") on top of all opponents' pieces (to create "stacks"). Play moves in circles until one player has captured every other players' cones on the board and declared the winner. All players are welcome to occupy any space throughout the game, provided the die rolls allow, and there are eight spaces that serve as "safe" spots, where a cone resting on this space cannot be captured. Captured pieces are not sent back to start, but are permanently lost.

Like similar games such as Trouble, Headache has its dice in a "pop-o-matic" bubble in the center of the board. The bubble is pressed to roll the dice. Unlike Trouble, which has a single die in the bubble, Headache has two dice. One die is a regular die featuring the numbers one through six. The other is blank on five sides, and has a red dot on the sixth side. The red dot, if rolled allows for an extra turn.

Headache was first introduced in 1968 by the Kohner Brothers and was later manufactured by Milton Bradley. In the UK the game (called Game of Headache) was released in 1968 through Peter Pan Playthings.

The board

Headache uses a round board in which movement is around the outside of the board, and the bubble with the dice is in the center. There is a starting point for each of the four colors. The board has a total of 48 spaces, including 8 safe spots (each marked with an X). Four of these eight safe spots are starting points. The spaces protrude from the surface of the board, thereby allowing the cones to rest on them neatly.

The board has two tracks, the outer and the inner track. The outer track has three spaces between Xs, and the inner track has two. Both tracks merge at each X. This difference allows players to strategically move around the board.

Any player who has their cone on a safe spot (X) cannot be captured, and an opponent is not permitted to land a cone on such a spot occupied by one. A player is allowed to keep his/her cone on an X as long as he or she wishes, provided there is another legal move. The exception is on the first four rounds of turns, in which each player must move a different cone, clearing the starting space.

Cones and stacks

The playing pieces in the game are known as "cones" (or "men" in the UK) because of their cone shape. This allows them to be stacked on top of one another in unlimited numbers. Each player starts off with four cones, and whenever one player lands on the space occupied by the cone of another, this player captures the opponent's cone. The capturing player places their cone on top of the cone of the player being captured, where it remains throughout the game. The result is known as a "stack." Stacks have the special privilege to move around the board in either direction, whereas single cones may only move clockwise.

References

Board games introduced in 1968
Children's board games
Cross and circle games
Milton Bradley Company games
Roll-and-move board games
Articles containing video clips
Running-fight board games